was an unprotected cruiser of the Imperial Japanese Navy. The name Takao comes from the Mount Takao, near Kyoto. Takao was used by the Imperial Japanese Navy primarily as an aviso or dispatch boat, for scouting, reconnaissance and the conveying of important messages.

Background
Takao was designed under the supervision of French military advisor Émile Bertin, and built in Japan by the Yokosuka Naval Arsenal, with many of its components imported from overseas.  It was one of the first ships in Bertin's project to introduce modern naval construction techniques to the Japanese, and a first step in the implementation of his Jeune Ecole naval strategy of using of small, heavily armed and lightly armored ships in naval warfare. Due to its small size Takao is sometimes classified as a corvette or gunboat.

Design
Takao was a steel-ribbed and steel-hulled vessel. It retained a full barque rigging with two masts for auxiliary sail propulsion in addition to her coal-fired double-expansion reciprocating steam engine with single smoke stack and twin screws. The design incorporated a number of firsts for Japan, including a double hull amidships for additional protection, and the first Japanese built torpedo launchers. It was also the second warship to be built in Japan (after the gunboat ) with an iron-rib and steel hull construction. Takao was armed with four  L/35 Krupp guns mounted in sponsons as its main battery and had one stern-mounted QF 4.7 inch Gun Mk I–IVs gun and one QF 6-pounder Hotchkiss gun as its secondary battery. In addition, the ship had two quadruple 1-inch Nordenfelt guns and carried two torpedoes, mounted on the deck.

Service record
Takao was laid down on 30 October 1886, launched on 15 October 1888 and completed on 16 November 1889. Takaos first captain was Commander Yamamoto Gonnohyōe.

Takao was active in the First Sino-Japanese War of 1894–1895, protecting troop transports to Korea, and covering the landing of Japanese forces at Port Arthur. It was subsequently involved in patrols of the Yellow Sea and was present at the Battle of Weihaiwei.

In 1900, Takaos rigging was removed, and weaponry modernized. Takao was assigned to assist in escorting transports supporting Japanese naval landing forces which occupied the port city of Tianjin in northern China during the Boxer Rebellion, as part of the Japanese contribution to the Eight-Nation Alliance, and subsequently patrolled the coasts off Amoy and Shanghai.

Considered obsolete by the time of the Russo-Japanese War of 1904–1905, Takao was assigned to rear guard patrols of Chemulpo harbor and Tsushima Strait, but was present with the rest of the Japanese fleet at the final decisive Battle of Tsushima.

The advent of wireless communication made the use of dispatch vessels obsolete, and Takao was removed from the navy list on 1 April 1911  and was demilitarized and sold on 27 March 1912. The ship was used as a survey vessel until being broken up in 1918.

Notes

References
 
 
 
 
 
 
 
 

Cruisers of the Imperial Japanese Navy
Ships built by Yokosuka Naval Arsenal
1888 ships
Naval ships of Japan
First Sino-Japanese War cruisers of Japan
Russo-Japanese War naval ships of Japan